Tsutomu Sakai (酒井 勉, born June 27, 1963 in Funabashi, Chiba, Japan) is a former Nippon Professional Baseball pitcher.

External links

1963 births
Living people
Japanese baseball players
Nippon Professional Baseball pitchers
Orix Braves players
Orix BlueWave players
Nippon Professional Baseball Rookie of the Year Award winners
Japanese baseball coaches
Nippon Professional Baseball coaches
Baseball people from Chiba Prefecture